Saalumarada Thimmakka, also known as Aala Marada Thimmakka, is an Indian environmentalist from the state of Karnataka, noted for her work in planting and tending to 385 banyan trees along a forty-five-kilometre stretch of highway between Hulikal and Kudur. She has also planted nearly 8000 other trees. With the support of her husband, she found solace in planting trees.

She received no formal education and worked as a casual labourer in a nearby quarry. Her work has been honoured with the National Citizen's Award of India. Her work was recognised by the Government of India and she was conferred with Padma Shri in 2019.

A U.S. environmental organisation based in Los Angeles and Oakland, California called Thimmakka's Resources for Environmental Education is named after her. Central University of Karnataka has announced an honorary doctorate for Thimmakka in the year 2020.

Early life
Thimmakka was born in Gubbi Taluk, Tumukuru District in Karnataka. She was married to Chikkaiah, a native of Hulikal village in the Magadi taluk of Ramanagara district in Karnataka. She received no formal education and worked as a casual labourer in a nearby quarry. The couple could not have children but, they had adopted a son named Surya Prakash. It is said that Thimmakka started to plant banyan trees in lieu of children. The name word Saalumarada (row of trees in the Kannada language) is how she is referred to because of her work.

Achievement
Ficus (banyan) trees were aplenty near Thimmakka's village. Thimakka and her husband started grafting saplings from these trees. Ten saplings were grafted in the first year and they were planted along a distance of 5 km near the neighbouring village of Kudur. 15 saplings were planted in the second year and 20 in the third year. She used her meager resources for planting these trees. The couple used to carry four pails of water for a distance of four kilometres to water the saplings. They were also protected from grazing cattle by fencing them with thorny shrubs.

The saplings were planted mostly during monsoon season so that sufficient rainwater would be available for them to grow. By the onset of the next monsoons, the saplings had invariably taken root. In total, 384 trees were planted, and their asset value has been assessed at around 1.5 million rupees. The management of these trees have now been taken over by the Government of Karnataka.

The 385 banyan trees planted and nurtured by her came under threat of being chopped down for the widening of Bagepalli-Halaguru road in 2019. Thimmakka requested the Chief Minister HD Kumaraswamy and Deputy Chief Minister G Parameshwara to reconsider the project. As a result, the government decided to look for alternatives to save the 70 years old trees.

Awards
For her achievement, Thimmakka has been conferred with the following awards and citations:
Padma Shri Saalumarada Thimmakka.The President, Shri Ram Nath Kovind presenting the Padma Shri Award to Saalumarada Thimmakka, at an Investiture Ceremony, at Rashtrapati Bhavan, in New Delhi on 16 March 2019

 Padma Shri award - 2019
 Nadoja Award By Hampi University- 2010
 National Citizen's award - 1995
 Indira Priyadarshini Vrikshamitra Awards - 1997
 Veerachakra Prashasthi Award - 1997
 Honour Certificate from the Women and Child Welfare Department, Government of Karnataka
 Certificate of Appreciation from the Indian Institute of Wood Science and Technology, Bangalore.
 Karnataka Kalpavalli Award - 2000
 Godfrey Phillips Bravery Award - 2006.
 Vishalakshi Award by Art of Living Organisation
 Vishwathma Award by Hoovinahole Foundation -2015
 One of BBC's 100 Women in 2016
 Honoured with She's Divine Award by I and You Being Together Foundation 2017
 Parisara Rathana award
 Green champion award
 Vrikshamatha award

Current activity

Thimmakka's husband died in 1991. Today, Thimmakka is invited to many afforestation programs in India. She has also been involved in other social activity like constructing a tank to store rainwater for the annual fair held in her village. She also has a dream of constructing a hospital in her village in remembrance of her husband and a trust has been set up for this purpose. In 1999, a documentary titled Thimmakka Mathu 284 Makkalu was made on her work and it featured in the 2000 International Film Festival of India. She underwent a hip surgery in December 2020 and was announced to be successful.

BBC recognition
In 2016, Saalumarada Thimmakka was listed by British Broadcasting Corporation as one of the most influential and inspirational women of the world.

Alleged misuse of name
Delhi settled comedian, Vasu Ritu Primlani has been accused by Thimmakka of misusing her name. Ms. Thimmakka had filed a private complaint before the Ramanagara Judicial Magistrate First Class (JFMC) court on 9 May against a non-resident Indian, Ritu Primlani, for running the organisation named after her for at least 14 years without her consent or knowledge.

In 2014, the High Court of Karnataka adjudicated in Ms Primlani's favour, stating that 'if all the charges against Ms Primlani were true, they still won't amount to a crime', and that this prosecution. See State of Karnataka Vs. Ritu Primlani. Ms Thimmakka had, in fact, met Ms Primlani in 2003, when Ms Primlani had made the effort to visit her, and Ms Thimmakka had stated she was 'delighted' that Ms Primlani had named an organisation after her to honour her.

Primlani had started the non-profit organisation more than a decade prior to the allegations. Thimmakka's adopted son, Umesh has claimed that the organisation misuses her name to collect donations. Ms Primlani had visited Thimmakka back in 2003 where photos were taken of her gifting Thimmakka with a saree. Now she is said to have allegedly taken Thimmakka's fingerprints, while she says Thimmakka okayed the non-profit back than in front of a judge.

Following the complaint, a policeman arrived at Alliance Francaise and Jagriti in Bangalore, venues where Ms Primlani was performing her shows, to take her into custody. Ms Primlani claims that she was taken into custody by a male policeman, after dark, which is against the law. She says that a dozen policemen had arrived at the venue though they did not disrupt her show. She claims to be harassed by Thimmakka's lawyers with written threats, which is an indication of extortion.

Though Thimmakka herself was mostly available for comment, she mentioned her meagre pension of Rs. 400 and has been quoted "What if there is a misuse and my name is tarnished?". Thimmakka has been of ill health lately and the treatment has taken a toll on her financial situation.

Gallery

References

External links 

 Thimmakka and Chikkanna were mocked - now their 300 trees serve and smile back
 image of Saalumarada Thimmakka on qph.is.quoracdn.net
 Saalumarada Thimmakka International Foundation.org

Indian environmentalists
People from Bangalore
Living people
1910s births
People from Belagavi district
Indian women environmentalists
Women from Karnataka
Activists from Karnataka
20th-century Indian women
20th-century Indian people
People from Ramanagara district
BBC 100 Women
Recipients of the Padma Shri in social work
Indian centenarians